The 2019 Korean FA Cup, known as the 2019 KEB Hana Bank FA Cup, was the 24th edition of the Korean FA Cup.

Daegu FC were the defending champions, but were eliminated in the round of 16 by Gyeongnam FC. Suwon Samsung Bluewings qualified for the group stage of the 2020 AFC Champions League after becoming eventual champions.

Schedule

Qualifying rounds

First round

Second round

Third round

Final rounds
The draw was held on 4 April 2019.

Bracket

Round of 32

Round of 16

Quarter-finals

Semi-finals

Final

References

External links
Official website 
Korean FA Cup at Soccerway
KFA regulations 

Korean FA Cup seasons
South Korea